James "Jim" Wright is an American businessman and politician. Wright owns environmental services companies. Wright is one of three members of the Railroad Commission of Texas, the elected regulatory body over oil, natural gas, utilities, and surface mining first established in 1891. He is a Republican.

A native of south Texas, Wright defeated incumbent Ryan Sitton in a primary, then won the general election held on November 3, 2020, against Chrysta Castañeda.

References 

Living people
Members of the Railroad Commission of Texas
Texas Republicans
Year of birth missing (living people)